Deltaretrovirus is a genus of the Retroviridae family. It consists of exogenous horizontally transmitted viruses found in several groups of mammals. , ICTV lists under this genus the Bovine leukemia virus and three species of primate T-lymphotropic virus.

The genus of viruses is known for its propensity to target immune cells and oncogenity, evident in the names of the four named species. Infection is usually asymptomatic, but inflammation and cancer can develop over time.

Classification 
Four species are recognized by the ICTV as of 2023:
 Bovine leukemia virus
 Primate T-lymphotropic virus 1
 Primate T-lymphotropic virus 2
 Primate T-lymphotropic virus 3

Two additional PTLVs are known but not regonized: HTLV-4 (South Cameroon, 2005) and STLV-5 (Mac B43 strain, highly divergent PTLV-1).

In addition, eight endogenous retroviruses identified as Deltaretrovirus are known as of 2019. Two of these were complete enough to show ORFs; the rest only showing long terminal repeats.

Hosts 
Known exogenous deltaretroviruses infect cattle and primates.

The two complete endogenous ones were found in bats and dolphins; the others in Solenodon, mongoose, and fossa. These endogenous examples fill in the large gap in the host range.

Clinical relevance

References

External links
 
 Viralzone: Deltaretrovirus

Deltaretroviruses
Virus genera